Bont may refer to:

 Bont F.C., a Welsh association football team
 Bonţ, village in Fizeșu Gherlii Commune, Cluj County, Romania
 Y Bont, nickname for Pontarddulais, a town in Swansea, Wales
 BONT, NASDAQ symbol for The Bon-Ton Stores, Inc.
 BoNT, abbreviation for botulinum toxin
 Debbie Bont, Dutch handball player
 Alexander Bont, fictional character in the Marvel Comics universe
 Robert Bont
 Henry Bont
 Marcus Bontempelli, an Australian rules footballer known by his nickname 'The Bont'.